In the United States, the title of first gentleman may be accorded to a man who is married to the head of state of a state government, analogously to the unofficial use of first lady for the wife or hostess of a head of state, including the wife of the president of the United States. Thus far there has been no first gentleman of the United States (i.e. male spouse of a president); however, Doug Emhoff became the first second gentleman of the United States when his wife Kamala Harris became vice president in 2021.

The first man formally to serve as first gentleman was James E. Ferguson in 1925, a former governor of Texas who was forced from office due to corruption charges, and whose wife Miriam A. Ferguson later won the office. The first man to serve as first gentleman without having previously served as governor was Thomas Grasso in 1975, husband of Connecticut governor Ella T. Grasso. In 2019, Colorado governor Jared Polis' husband Marlon Reis (who at the time was his partner), became the first same-sex partner to receive the title of First Gentleman (in addition to being the first same-sex partner of a sitting governor).

Even though Arizona has had the most female governors of any U.S. state with four female governors, only two of these governors were married to a first gentleman while in office. Six states have had more than one first gentleman: New Hampshire and Kansas, with three, and Arizona, Connecticut, Michigan, and Oregon, all numbering two.

First gentlemen by state

 Currently serving

First gentlemen by U.S. territory

 Currently serving

See also 
 List of current United States first spouses
 List of female governors in the United States
 "Oh, Jeez" (2016), the seventh episode in the twentieth season of South Park, previously called "The Very First Gentleman".

References

Lists of American people
Lists of men
Men in the United States
Spouses of United States state governors
United States politics-related lists
Lists of spouses
Husbands